Nur ad-Din Muhammad (r. 1175–1185 CE) was a member of the Artuqid dynasty, and the son of Fahkr al-Din Qara Arslan (Kara Arslan).

Life
Nur ad-Din Muhammad was the Artuqid ruler of the Diyar Bakr, the northernmost region of Mesopotamia. In 1179 he received Saladin's protection against the Sultanate of Rum, with whom he had been feuding. In 1183 Saladin granted him the recently conquered Amida in return for his assistance against Mosul.

References

Bibliography

See also
Artuqids

External links
 Encyclopaedia of Islam, VIII. 135-136 (link)

Artuqids
Turkic rulers
Year of birth unknown
1185 deaths